The Order of Al-Said (Wisam Al-Sa'id) is the highest order of Oman.

History 
The Order of Al-Said (originally Wisam ud-Daula al-Saidi al-Omaniya) was instituted in 1913 by Faisal bin Turki, Sultan of Muscat and Oman. The order had different grades which fell in disuse over the years. Sultan Qaboos reformed the old order of knighthood in 1982 to bring it to a one-grade order. The new name is "Wisam Al-Sa'id".

Insignia 
The ribbon is red with central green stripe.

Recipients 
 King Hussein bin Talal of Jordan
 Beatrix of the Netherlands
 Queen Elizabeth II
 Sabah Al-Ahmad Al-Jaber Al-Sabah
Salman of Saudi Arabia
Mohamed bin Zayed Al Nahyan

References

Other sources 
 World Medals Index,

Said
Al-Said, Order of
Awards established in 1913
Awards established in 1982
1913 establishments in Oman